Aegidius Bucherius (or Bucherus) (1576–1665) was a French Jesuit and chronological scholar. His real name was Gilles Bouchier (or, less likely, Boucher).

Bucherius was born in Arras.  His Doctrina Temporum from 1634 published for the first time some important chronological documents, in particular the Chronography of 354, and work on computation of the date of Easter (the cycle of Victorius of Aquitaine). He also published Anatolius Laodicensis and Hippolytus Romanus.

Originally at Béthune, he moved to Liège, where for six years he was Rector of the College.  He died in Tournai.

Works
 Belgium Romanum ecclesiasticum et civile
 De doctrina temporum commentarius in Victorium Aquitanum (Antwerp 1634)

Notes

1576 births
1665 deaths
17th-century French Jesuits
17th-century French writers
17th-century French male writers
French chroniclers